The 2016 Lotto Warsaw FIM Speedway Grand Prix of Poland was the second race of the 2016 Speedway Grand Prix season. It took place on May 14 at the Stadion Narodowy in Warsaw, Poland.

Riders 
For the second successive Grand Prix first reserve Fredrik Lindgren replaced Jarosław Hampel, who had injured himself during the 2015 Speedway World Cup and was not fit to compete. The Speedway Grand Prix Commission also nominated Patryk Dudek as the wild card, and Maksym Drabik and Paweł Przedpełski both as Track Reserves.

Results 
The Grand Prix was won by world champion Tai Woffinden, who beat Greg Hancock, Matej Žagar and Chris Holder in the final. Fredrik Lindgren had top stored during the 20 qualifying heats, but was eliminated in the semi-finals. Holder's fourth place in the final resulted in him taking the overall series lead from Peter Kildemand, who failed to make the semi-finals, with 26 points. Woffinden and Hancock finished just two points behind on 24.

Heat details

The intermediate classification

References

See also 
 motorcycle speedway

Poland
Speedway Grand Prix